Flourtown is a census-designated place (CDP) in Springfield Township, Montgomery County, Pennsylvania. Flourtown is adjacent to the neighborhoods of Erdenheim, Oreland, Whitemarsh, and Chestnut Hill. The population of Flourtown was 4,538 at the 2010 census. Its ZIP code is 19031.

History
Founded in 1743, the community was so named on account of a flouring mill near the original town site. In 1940, the Pennsylvania guide, compiled by the Writers' Program of the Works Progress Administration, noted that regional farmers had previously come to the area to buy supplies and "have their wheat ground by the millers along the Wissahickon. Most of the houses are old, many dating to Colonial times. Flourtown's sole commercial activity is carried on by a few antique shops."

The Black Horse Inn was listed on the National Register of Historic Places in 2005.

Scenes for the QVC Original movie Holly and the Hot Chocolate were shot in the parking lot of the Executive Motor shop and Scoogi's Italian Restaurant, both at the intersection of Bethlehem Pike and Arlingham Road.

Geography
Flourtown is located at  (40.105377, -75.207524).

Demographics

As of the 2010 census, the CDP was 89.3% White, 5.3% Black or African American, 0.1% Native American, 2.1% Asian, 0.4% were Some Other Race, and 1.5% were two or more races. 1.8% of the population were of Hispanic or Latino ancestry.

As of the census of 2000, there were 4,669 people, 1,746 households, and 1,292 families living in the CDP. The population density was 3,305.0 people per square mile (1,278.5/km2). There were 1,772 housing units at an average density of 1,254.3/sq mi (485.2/km2). The racial makeup of the CDP was 93.72% White, 3.30% African American, 1.84% Asian, 0.32% from other races, and 0.81% from two or more races. Hispanic or Latino of any race were 0.69% of the population. 24.2% were of Irish, 14.2% Italian, 12.7% German and 11.5% English ancestry according to Census 2000.

There were 1,746 households, out of which 32.1% had children under the age of 18 living with them, 64.0% were married couples living together, 7.4% had a female householder with no husband present, and 26.0% were non-families. 22.2% of all households were made up of individuals, and 12.5% had someone living alone who was 65 years of age or older. The average household size was 2.58 and the average family size was 3.05.

In Flourtown, the population was spread out, with 23.5% under the age of 18, 4.3% from 18 to 24, 25.5% from 25 to 44, 26.0% from 45 to 64, and 20.7% who were 65 years of age or older. The median age was 43 years. For every 100 females, there were 88.8 males. For every 100 females age 18 and over, there were 82.3 males.

The median income for a household in the CDP was $76,465, and the median income for a family was $88,249. Males had a median income of $59,844 versus $42,472 for females. The per capita income for the CDP was $32,848. About 1.0% of families and 1.8% of the population were below the poverty line, including 1.0% of those under age 18 and 2.2% of those age 65 or over.

Organizations
Flourtown Fire Company was established in 1910 and provides fire and emergency services to Springfield Township and the communities of Flourtown, Erdenheim, Oreland, Wyndmoor, and beyond through mutual aid agreements.

The Klingon Language Institute was founded in Flourtown in 1992.

Educational institutions
Mount Saint Joseph Academy
St. Genevieve's School (Catholic K-8)

Notable people
Laura Breckenridge, actress
Matt Guokas Sr., professional basketball player and announcer and MLB announcer
Lydie Marland (née Roberts), socialite and First Lady of Oklahoma
Mike Richter, professional hockey player

See also
Philadelphia Cricket Club

References

External links

Census-designated places in Montgomery County, Pennsylvania
Census-designated places in Pennsylvania